Trifolium kingii, the King's clover, is a perennial clover in the legume family (Fabaceae)

The plant is native to the Western United States, in California, Nevada, Arizona, and Utah.

It grows in the Great Basin region, and the Sierra Nevada alpine zone.

References

External links
 Calflora Database: Trifolium kingii  (King's clover)
USDA Plants Profile for Trifolium kingii (King's clover)
UC CalPhotos gallery:  Trifolium kingii

kingii
Flora of California
Flora of Arizona
Flora of Nevada
Flora of Utah
Flora of the Great Basin
Flora of the Sierra Nevada (United States)
Taxa named by Sereno Watson
Flora without expected TNC conservation status